Miho Adachi (born June 19, 1979) is a Japanese sprint canoer who competed in the mid-2000s. She finished ninth in the K-4 500 m event at the 2004 Summer Olympics in Athens.

External links
Sports-Reference.com profile

1979 births
Canoeists at the 2004 Summer Olympics
Japanese female canoeists
Living people
Olympic canoeists of Japan
Asian Games medalists in canoeing
Canoeists at the 1998 Asian Games
Canoeists at the 2002 Asian Games
Medalists at the 2002 Asian Games
Asian Games bronze medalists for Japan